The 2003 Croatian Figure Skating Championships ( took place between December 21 and 23. Skaters competed in the disciplines of men's singles and ladies' singles.

Senior results

Men

Ladies

Junior results

Ladies

External links
 results 

Croatian Figure Skating Championships
2002 in figure skating
Croatian Figure Skating Championships, 2003